The first Touch Football World Cup tournament was held in 1988. Touch football and the Touch football world cup are monitored by the international governing body for touch the FIT (Federation of International Touch). The Touch world cup has been hosted in five continents (Asia, Oceania, Europe, North America, Africa) but is yet to be played in South America. Australia has hosted the World Cup the most having hosted it thrice. While the number of participant teams is growing steadily, almost all finals to date have been contested between Australia and New Zealand. Australia has won the most finals.

Touch as included in the Touch world cup is played on a rectangular 70m x 50m pitch. It is played six aside with eight substitutes. The match is played for 40 minutes in two twenty-minute halves. Touch unlike many other football variants always uses three referees and this is the same in the Touch football world cup. 

Touch football and therefore the Touch World Cup are seen as competitors to its Rugby Union equivalent, Tag rugby and the Tag rugby world cup, which is held every three years, the Touch Rugby World Cup is instead held every four years much like the football and rugby (league and union) world cups.

World Cup Venues
The following outlines the World Cups held and planned for the future
 1988 -  (Gold Coast)
 1991 -  (Auckland)
 1995 -  (Hawaii)
 1999 -  (Sydney)
 2003 -  (Kumagaya)
 2007 -  (Stellenbosch)
 2011 -  (Edinburgh)
 2015 -  (Coffs Harbour)
 2019 -  (Putrajaya)
 2023 - TBD

World Cup Results

1988 - Australia (Gold Coast)
World Cup # : 1
Dates : 14–16 November 1988
Participants : 5 (Australia, Canada, New Zealand, Papua New Guinea, USA)
Location : Carrara Oval, Gold Coast, Queensland, Australia
Overall winner : Australia

1991 - New Zealand (Auckland)
World Cup # : 2
Dates : 3–7 December 1991
Participants : 9 (Australia, Cook Islands, Fiji, Japan, New Zealand, Niue, Papua New Guinea, Samoa, Tokelau)
Location : Avondale Racecourse, Auckland, New Zealand
Overall winner : Australia

1995 - USA, Hawaii (Waikiki Beach)
World Cup # : 3
Dates : 21–25 March 1995
Participants : 11 (American Samoa, Australia, Cook Islands, Japan, New Zealand, Niue, Papua New Guinea, Samoa, South Africa, Tonga, United States)
Location : Kapiolani Park, Waikiki Beach, Hawaii, United States
Overall winner : Australia

1999 - Australia (Sydney)
World Cup # : 4
Dates : 21–24 April 1999
Participants : 19 (Australia, Cook Islands, England, Fiji, Italy, Japan, Lebanon, New Zealand, Niue, Papua New Guinea, Samoa, Scotland, Singapore, Solomon Islands, South Africa, Tokelau, Tonga, USA, Wales)
Location : David Phillips Sports Fields, Daceyville, Sydney, Australia
Overall winner : Australia

2003 - Japan (Kumagaya)
World Cup # : 5
Dates : 24–28 May 2003
Participants : 10 (Australia, Japan, New Zealand, Niue, Scotland, Singapore, South Africa, Thailand, USA, Wales)
Location : Kumagaya Rugby Complex, Kumagaya, Japan
Overall winner : Australia

2007 - South Africa (Stellenbosch)
World Cup # : 6
Dates : 17–21 January 2007
Participants : 15 (Australia, England, Fiji, France, Japan, Jersey, Lebanon, New Zealand, Samoa, Scotland, Singapore, South Africa, Switzerland, USA, Wales)
Location : Danie Craven Stadium, Stellenbosch, South Africa
Overall winner : Australia

2011 - Scotland (Edinburgh)
World Cup # : 7
Dates : 22–26 June 2011
Participants : 26 (Australia, Austria, Belgium, Catalonia, Cook Islands, England, Fiji, France, Germany, Guernsey, Hungary, Ireland, Italy, Japan, Jersey, Luxembourg, Netherlands, New Zealand, Niue, Scotland, Singapore, South Africa, Spain, Switzerland, United States and Wales)
Location : Peffermill Sports Centre, Edinburgh, Scotland
Overall winner : Australia

2015 - Australia (Coffs Harbour)
World Cup # : 8
Dates : 29 April - 3 May 2015
Participants : 25 (Australia, Chile, China, Cook Islands, England, France, Fiji, Germany, Hong Kong, Ireland, Italy, Japan, Malaysia, Middle East Touch, Netherlands, New Zealand, Niue, Papua New Guinea, Philippines, Samoa, Scotland, Singapore, South Africa, United States, Wales)
Location : Coffs Harbour International Stadium, Coffs Harbour, Australia
Overall winner : Australia

Squads
The competition featured ninety teams from twenty five participating nations.

2019 - World Cup (Malaysia,Putrajaya)
World Cup # : 9
Dates : 29 April - 4 May 2019
Participants : 28 (Australia, Belgium, Chile, China, Chinese Taipei, Cook Islands, England, Europe, France, Fiji, Germany, Great Britain, Hong Kong, Ireland, Italy, Japan, Malaysia, Netherlands, New Zealand, Niue, Papua New Guinea, Philippines, Samoa, Scotland, Singapore, South Africa, United Arab Emirates, United States, Wales)
Location : Taman Ekuestrian, Putrajaya, Malaysia
Overall winner : Australia

Overall Runners up : New Zealand 

The 2019 Touch Football World Cup is the latest edition of the Touch football world cup. All divisions consisted of a round robin of 1 or more groups, and a finals series. Some groups also consisted of a playoff series.

References

External links 
2011 World Cup website

Touch competitions
Touch
World cups
Recurring sporting events established in 1988
Annual sporting events